Paul Watson (born 5 May 1962) is a former professional English road racing cyclist from Milton Keynes. He was national road race champion, raced in the Tour de France and made headlines finishing 6th in the Belgium classic La Flèche Wallonne.

Palmarès

Road
1984
2nd Grand Prix de la Ville de Lillers
1985
14th World Championship road race (Amateur)
1st Stage 10 Milk Race, Halifax
3rd Overall, Milk Race
 Winner of the British National Road Race Championships (Amateur)
1986
3rd Stage 11 Milk Race, Welwyn Garden City
3rd in Stage 1 Mercian Two-Day
3rd Overall, Mercian Two-Day
1987
3rd La Marseillaise
6th British National Road Race Championships (Professional)
 DNF- Tour de France
3rd GP Besseges
6th La Flèche Wallonne
4th Overall, Milk Race
5th Norwich Spring Classic

General classification results timeline

Cyclo Cross
1981
2nd British National Cyclo Cross Championships
1982
4th British National Cyclo Cross Championships

External links

Sources 
 Fleche Redux: Paul Watson Remembers '87
  ANC-HALFORDS: Paul Watson
 commentary » paul watson
 The-Sports.org

1962 births
Living people
English male cyclists
British cycling road race champions
People from Milton Keynes
Sportspeople from Buckinghamshire